HMS Sunderland was a 60-gun fourth rate ship of the line of the Royal Navy, launched at Southampton on 17 March 1694.

Sunderland was hulked in 1715, and sunk as part of the foundation of a breakwater in 1737.

Notes

References

Lavery, Brian (2003) The Ship of the Line - Volume 1: The development of the battlefleet 1650-1850. Conway Maritime Press. .

Ships of the line of the Royal Navy
1690s ships
Ships sunk as breakwaters